The Naiman (Mongolian: Найман, Naiman, "eight"; ; Kazakh: Найман, Naiman; Uzbek: Nayman) were a medieval tribe originating in the territory of modern Western Mongolia (possibly during the time of the Uyghur Khaganate), and are one of the tribes of modern Mongols and in the middle juz of the Kazakh nation.

History
In The Secret History of the Mongols, the Naiman subtribe the "Güchügüd" are mentioned. According to Russian Turkologist Nikolai Aristov's view, the Naiman Khanate's western border reached the Irtysh River and its eastern border reached the Mongolian Tamir River. The Altai Mountains and southern Altai Republic were part of the Naiman Khanate. They had diplomatic relations with the Kara-Khitans, and were subservient to them until 1175. In the Russian and Soviet historiography of Central Asia they were traditionally ranked among the Mongol-speaking tribes. For instance, such Russian orientalists as Vasily Bartold, Grigory Potanin, Boris Vladimirtsov, Ilya Petrushevsky, Nicholas Poppe, Lev Gumilyov, Vadim Trepavlov classified them as one of mongol tribes. Other scholars classified them as a Turkic people from Sekiz Oghuz (means "Eight Oghuz" in Turkic). However, the term "Naiman" has Mongolian origin meaning "eight", but their titles are Turkic, and they are thought by some to be possibly Mongolized Turks. They have been described as Turkic-speaking, as well as Mongolian-speaking. Like the Khitans and the Uyghurs, many of them were Nestorian Christians or Buddhists.

The Naimans were located to the west of the Mongols, and there were more Naimans than Mongols in the late 12th century. In 1199, Temüjin (Genghis Khan) together with an ally Ong khan launched a campaign against the Naimans. They defeat Buyirugh, a Naiman khan who ruled the mountain lineage. In 1203, the last Tayang khan, the ruler of Naimans of the steppe, was killed after a battle with Genghis Khan. His son Kuchlug with his remaining Naiman troops then fled to the Kara-Khitan Khanate. Kuchlug was well received there and the Khitan Khan gave him his daughter in marriage. Kuchlug soon began plotting against his new father-in-law, and after he usurped the throne, he began to persecute Muslims in the Hami Oases. But his action was opposed by local people and he was later defeated by the Mongols under Jebe.

Although the Naiman Khanlig was crushed by the Mongols, they were seen in every part of the Mongol Empire. Ogedei's great khatun ("queen") Töregene might have been from this tribe. Hulegu had a Naiman general, Ketbuqa, who died in the Battle of Ain Jalut in 1260.

After the collapse of the Yuan dynasty, the Naiman were eventually assimilated into Mongol, Tatar, and Kazakh tribes.

Ethnic roots 
According to Lee & Kuang, the Naiman and the Önggüt tribes were descending from the remainders of Turkic peoples of Central and Eastern Mongolia, which stood not in contact with Iranian groups West of the Altai mountains, unlike "Western Turks". They were loosely controlled by the Khitan Liao and Jurchen. They were known to resemble ancient Tujue and later Mongols and their girls were known to be beautiful.

Among Mongols 
The modern Naiman tribe is a Mongol ethnic group in Naiman Banner, Inner Mongolia of China. The clan Naiman changed the clan name and mixed with other tribes in Mongolia.

Among Turkic peoples 

Modern Kazakh historians claim that more than 2 million of the Kazakh population are Naimans (see Modern Kazakh tribes or Middle Juz). They originate from eastern Kazakhstan. Some Naimans dissimilated with the Kyrgyz and Uzbek ethnicities and are still found among them. Now, the Naimans are one of the big tribes of modern Kazakh peoples, they belong to Middle Juz of Kazakhs, live mainly in the eastern, central and southern parts of Kazakhstan, with a population of approximately 
one  million among Kazakhs in Kazakhstan. 

They also exist with considerable population among the Kazakhs in China, Uzbekistan and Russia, the Naiman tribe populations in the Kazakhs in China is 700000 or more, mostly living in the western part of Xinjiang Uighur Autonomous Region of China, in the Ili Kazakh Autonomous Prefecture. Naimans are also one of the major tribe among Kazakhs in the Uzbekistan, they also exist among Kazakhs in Kyrgyzstan and Russia.See Naimans introduction in Kazakh language, "Kazakh shezhire".

Among Hazaras 
There is a tribe of Sheikh Ali Hazaras who are of Naiman origin. In Afghanistan they mainly reside in the Sheikh Ali district of Parwan province.

Religion
The main religion of the Naimans was shamanism and Nestorian Christianity. The Naimans that adopted Nestorianism probably converted around the same time the Keraites adopted the religion in the 11th century. They remained so after the Mongol conquest and were among the second wave of Christians to enter China with Kublai Khan. Some Nestorian Naiman fled to Kara Khitai during the Mongol conquests where some converted to Buddhism. 

There was a tradition that the Naimans and their Christian relatives, the Keraites, descended from the Biblical Magi. The commander of the Mongol army that invaded Syria in 1259, Kitbuqa, was a Naiman: he is recorded to have "loved and honoured the Christians, because he was of the lineage of the Three Kings of Orient who came to Bethlehem to adore the nativity of Our Lord".  However, Kitbuqa was slain and his army decisively defeated at the Battle of Ain Jalut, ensuring continued Muslim hegemony over the Levant. 

Nestorianism declined and vanished among the Naiman soon after the collapse of the Yuan dynasty. Mongolian Naimans converted to Tibetan Buddhism in the sixteenth century. The Naiman assimilated into other ethnic groups living in Eurasia and likely adopted the religion and culture of the dominant group. The Naimans who settled in the western khanates of the Mongol Empire all eventually converted to Islam.

See also
 List of medieval Mongol tribes and clans
 Southern Mongolian dialect

References

External links
Naiman tribe of Kazakh people – from Wikipedia Naiman introduction in Kazakh language
see the Naiman of Kazakhs at tribal system of Kazakh people www.elim.kz
The relationship between Naimans with Khitans

Mongol peoples
History of Mongolia
History of Inner Mongolia
Mongolian tribes and clans
Southern Mongols
Hazara tribes
Nestorianism
Kazakh tribes
Turkic peoples of Asia